The Staten Island Children's Museum is a children's museum on the grounds of Sailors' Snug Harbor on Staten Island, New York. The museum opened in 1976 following community and government support for the project. The museum stresses a hands-on interactive approach to its exhibits.  A large metal sculpture of a praying mantis, named Francis the Praying Mantis, is located in front of the museum.

History
Founded by a group of parents in 1974, the Staten Island Children's Museum opened in 1976 in a small rented storefront with one exhibit and program. A series of “hands-on, minds-on” exhibitions followed about history, the natural science and fine arts. By 1980, space limitations drove the museum to seek larger quarters. The City of New York invited the Children's Museum to join the Cultural Institutions Group, which included plans for the Museum to relocate to the ground so the newly acquired 83-acre Snug Harbor. Planning, funding and renovations for the new home at Snug Harbor Cultural Center took six years to complete and in 1986, the museum opened the doors to its new home. In 2003, the facility expanded to 40,000 square feet with the addition of the historic barn and the bi-level glass passageway. In 2013, the Museum completed another capital project, with the addition of a state-of-the-art tented picnic and performance pavilion on the East Meadow, and a vertical axis wind turbine and wind scoop addition to its roof.

Building history

The Children's Museum consists of two buildings with a connecting walkway. The main building, that houses the museum administrative offices, the live animal collection, the fire truck and the "house about it" exhibit, was originally built in 1913 as part of the Snug Harbor Complex. The portion of the museum that houses the food court area and the great explorations exhibits is the old snug harbor barn, where the livestock was originally kept to feed the residents of Sailors Snug Harbor. When the museum was developed, a modern walkway was built connecting the two structures to create one museum building.

During the 1950s, the building was designated as civil defense shelter for local residents in the event of an air raid. The sign can still be found on the back of the building.

Mission
The Museum's mission is to nurture the creativity and curiosity natural to all children, to recognize and celebrate different learning styles, and to demonstrate vividly that learning can be exciting and fun. The Museum is committed to achieving these goals through programming that emphasizes direct and authentic hands-on experiences conducted in a welcoming and pleasing environment. It encourages participation by visitors of all abilities and endeavors to reach beyond its walls to serve as an educational resource for the members of its diverse community, especially families and schools.

Exhibits and programs

The Children's Museum features 10 indoor and two outdoor exhibits, a dedicated art workshop and a performance space. Visitors can explore different climates, examine live and preserved bugs and other arthropods, learn about construction and urban planning, build with blocks, hop on board a fire truck and play games throughout the interactive exhibits. The four-acre East Meadow offers an outdoor setting to run, play and picnic. A large metal sculpture of a praying mantis, named Francis the Praying Mantis, is located in front of the Staten Island Children's Museum.

In addition to the exhibits, the museum hosts a variety of programs throughout the year, including cultural performances and celebrations, the Con Edison Second Saturday Science! monthly workshops, ShopRite Kidz Cook sessions, summertime Boogie Woogie Wednesday dance performances, as well as mini-camps during the summer and NYC public school recess weeks.

Each June, the Staten Island Children's Museum hosts its Carnival & Science Spectacular!, which includes STEAM-based activities.

Admission 
Admission is $8 for everyone who is at least one year old, but is free for Children's Museum members. Group visits for 10 or more should be arranged in advance. Free admission days are sponsored throughout the year, and adults unaccompanied by children are not admitted.

Visitor services 
The Staten Island Children's Museum offers private spaces for breastfeeding. The building is accessible to disabled people under the Americans with Disabilities Act of 1990. The museum offers a guide specifically for children with sensory issues.

Grants
The museums veterinary and pet care exhibit was created in part with support from VCA veterinary clinics. In 2005, the museum was among 406 New York City arts and social service institutions to receive part of a $20 million grant from the Carnegie Corporation, which was made possible through a donation by New York City mayor Michael Bloomberg.

References

Museums established in 1976
Museums in Staten Island
Children's museums in New York City
Sailors' Snug Harbor